Paraguay is scheduled to compete at the 2023 Pan American Games in Santiago, Chile from October 20 to November 5, 2023. This was Paraguay's 17th appearance at the Pan American Games, having competed at every edition of the games except 1959 and 1963.

Competitors
The following is the list of number of competitors (per gender) participating at the games per sport/discipline.

Cycling

BMX
Paraguay qualified one female cyclist in BMX race through the UCI World Rankings.

Racing

Equestrian

Paraguay qualified one equestrian in Jumping at the 2022 South American Games.

Jumping

Fencing

Paraguay qualified one female fencer through the 2022 Pan American Fencing Championships in Ascuncion, Paraguay.

Individual

Football

Women's tournament

Paraguay qualified a women's team of 18 athletes after finishing fourth at the 2022 Copa América Femenina in Colombia.

Summary

Handball

Women's tournament

Paraguay qualified a women's team (of 14 athletes) by finishing second in the 2022 South American Games. 

Summary

Karate

Paraguay qualified a team of 3 karatekas (one man and two women) at the 2022 South American Games.

Kumite

Roller sports

Figure
Paraguay qualified a team of two athletes in figure skating (one man and one woman).

Rowing

Paraguay qualified two athletes (one man and one woman) after winning the respective categories during the 2021 Junior Pan-American Games.

Men

Women

Rugby sevens

Women's tournament

Paraguay qualified a women's team (of 12 athletes) by finishing second in the 2022 South American Games.

Summary

Shooting

Paraguay qualified a total of one shooter after the 2022 Americas Shooting Championships.

Women
Shotgun

Tennis

Paraguay qualified one female athlete after reaching the final of the singles tournament in the 2022 South American Games.

Women

See also
Paraguay at the 2024 Summer Olympics

References

Nations at the 2023 Pan American Games
2023
2023 in Paraguayan sport